Hartlepool is a railway station on the Durham Coast Line, which runs between Newcastle and Middlesbrough via Hartlepool. It is owned by Network Rail and managed by Northern Trains.

History
The Stockton and Hartlepool Railway, which connected the town of West Hartlepool with the Clarence Railway near , was opened for goods on 12 November 1839 and to passengers on 1 December 1839. A station named Hartlepool West was opened on 9 February 1841; this was renamed West Hartlepool in February 1848, and closed on 3 May 1880 when it was replaced by a new West Hartlepool station. This in turn was renamed Hartlepool on 26 April 1967, when West Hartlepool was merged with Hartlepool and following the complete closure of the former Hartlepool Dock & Railway station in the Headland, previously known as Hartlepool, in 1964.

The station has two platforms currently in use: a bi-directionally signalled through platform (the original down platform), used by almost all timetabled services and a south-facing bay platform (with only one weekly booked departure). The former up platform 1 has been disused since the footbridge linking the platforms was removed in the late 1990s. In August 2013 Grand Central proposed reopening the disused up platform as part of its track access application extension although they never implemented this proposal. In September 2020, Tees Valley Combined Authority launched a £1.5 million study to investigate the feasibility of a similar scheme to reopen the former up platform so as to improve capacity through the station. In March 2022, it was announced that funding had been secured to bring the old platform back into use, with a new footbridge and lifts installed, by June 2023. This is the only station on the route to have only one through platform. Trains travelling to and from Newcastle and Middlesbrough have to wait if there is another train in the station coming out in the other direction before they can go in.

Between November 2009 and August 2010 (ahead of the town hosting the Tall Ships' Races), the station was extensively refurbished as part of a £4 million scheme to improve station facilities and integrate it into the new Hartlepool Interchange. The line through the station was also re-signalled in spring 2010 as part of the Durham Coast modernisation scheme, with the consequent loss of three manual signal boxes in and around the station. A new waiting room was also added to the station in 2011.

Facilities
The station has a staffed ticket office, which is open from 07:25 to 18:20 Mondays through Saturdays (closed Sundays). A self-service ticket machine is also provided near the station entrance for use when the ticket office is closed and for collecting pre-paid tickets. Ticket barriers have been operation at the station since September 2017. Train running information is offered via automatic announcements, digital display screens and timetable posters. There are toilets in the ticket office and a waiting room on the concourse, along with vending machines dispensing snacks and cold drinks. Step-free access is available from the entrance to the platforms.

Services

Grand Central

As of the June 2021 timetable change, there are four trains per day heading south towards London King's Cross via York. Heading north towards Sunderland, there are five trains per day on weekdays, with four and three trains per day on Saturday and Sunday respectively.

Rolling stock used: Class 180 Adelante

Northern Trains

As of the May 2021 timetable change, the station is served by an hourly service between Newcastle and Middlesbrough. Most trains continue to Hexham (or Carlisle on Sunday) and Nunthorpe. Two trains per day (three on Sunday) continue to Whitby. Two trains operate between Hartlepool and Darlington on Sunday, one of which operates the once-weekly parliamentary service to Teesside Airport.

Rolling stock used: Class 156 Super Sprinter and Class 158 Express Sprinter

References

External links

Railway stations in the Borough of Hartlepool
Former North Eastern Railway (UK) stations
Railway stations in Great Britain opened in 1841
Railway stations in Great Britain closed in 1880
Railway stations in Great Britain opened in 1880
Railway stations served by Grand Central Railway
Northern franchise railway stations
Buildings and structures in Hartlepool
DfT Category D stations